Protein transport protein Sec16B also known as regucalcin gene promoter region-related protein p117 (RGPR-p117) and leucine zipper transcription regulator 2 (LZTR2) is a protein that in humans is encoded by the SEC16B gene.

Discovery 

RGPR-p117, which was named as a regucalcin gene promoter region-related protein, was originally discovered as a novel transcription factor that specifically binds to a nuclear factor I (NFI) consensus motif TTGGC(N)6CC that is located on the 5’-flanking region of the regucalcin gene (rgn) in 2001. This gene is a highly conserved a leucine zipper motif, and it was also named as the leucine zipper transcription regulator 2 (LZTR2). In 2007, RGPR-p117 was also renamed as Sec16 homologue B (SEC16B), an endoplasmic reticulum export factor.

Gene 

The gene consists of 26 exons spanning approximately 4.1 kbp and is localized on human chromosome 1q25.2. This gene expression is stimulated through various signaling factors in cells. RGPR-p117 is present in the plasma membranes, cytoplasm, mitochondria, microsomes and nucleus of the cells. Cytoplasm RGPR-p117 is translocated to nucleus. Phosphorylated RGPR-p117 specifically binds to the TTGGC motif in the promoter region of various genes to enhance the gene expression of various proteins, and plays a crucial role as a transcription factor in the cells.

Function 

In the role in the regulation of cell regulation, RGPR-p117 possesses protective effects on apoptotic cell death induced by various signaling factors. Overexpression of RGPR-p117 did not cause an alteration of cell proliferation and led to significant decreases in protein and DNA contents in cloned normal rat kidney proximal tubular epithelial NRK52E cells. It also plays a role as an endoplasmic reticulum export factor to deliver to newly synthesized proteins and lipids to the Golgi. RGPR-p117/SEC16B may be involved in human obesity to possess an association between single nucleotide polymorphisms and different measures of obesity.

Model organisms 

Model organisms have been used in the study of SEC16B function. A conditional knockout mouse line, called Sec16btm1a(KOMP)Wtsi was generated as part of the International Knockout Mouse Consortium program — a high-throughput mutagenesis project to generate and distribute animal models of disease to interested scientists.

Male and female animals underwent a standardized phenotypic screen to determine the effects of deletion. Twenty one tests were carried out on mutant mice and one significant abnormality was observed: homozygote mutants had decreased circulating cholesterol levels.

References

Further reading 

 
 
 

Genes mutated in mice